Battle of Darzab may refer to either of these events in Darzab District, Jowzjan Province, Afghanistan:

 Battle of Darzab (2017), among the Taliban, ISIL, and Afghan armed forces in April
 Battle of Darzab (2018), between the Taliban and ISIL in July